Remplingen Peak is a peak, 2,650 m, at the north end of Langfloget Cliff in the Muhlig-Hofmann Mountains, Queen Maud Land. Mapped by Norwegian cartographers from surveys and air photos by the Norwegian Antarctic Expedition (1956–60) and named Remplingen (the calf).

Mountains of Queen Maud Land
Princess Martha Coast